Dong Zijian (born 19 December 1993) is a Chinese actor. He is best known for his roles in Young Style (2013), Mountains May Depart (2015), De Lan (2015) and At Cafe 6 (2016).

Early life and education
Dong is born in Beijing, China. His father, Dong Zhi Hua is also an actor; and his mother, Wang Jing Hua is an artist manager in China. He studied at the Beijing Haidian Foreign Language Shi Yan School, Yew Chung International School of Beijing and Beijing NO.80 Middle School in his earlier years. In 2014, he was admitted to the Central Academy of Drama.

Career
Dong made his debut in the youth drama film Young Style by Liu Jie, for which he won the Best Actor award at the China Movie Channel Media Awards.

In 2014, Dong featured in the horror film Bunshinsaba 3, directed by Ahn Byeong-ki; followed by the youth drama film The Ark of Mr. Chow.

In 2015, he was nominated for the Best Actor award at the Cannes Film Festival for his performance in Mountains May Depart, a realistic melodrama pic directed by Jia Zhangke. Dong reunited with director Liu Jie to star in his film, De Lan, a rural tale that revolves around a loan officer who travels to a remote village and strikes up a complicated relationship with a Tibetan woman. De Lan won the Best Feature Film award at the Shanghai International Film Festival.

In 2016, he starred in the Taiwanese coming-of-age film At Cafe 6. He also had a supporting role in the thriller film Hide and Seek which co-starred Wallace Huo.

In 2017, Dong starred in Young Love Lost, a comedy film by first-time director Xiang Guoqiang. He was praised for his excellent portrayal as a young roustabout who has no clear goals. He also featured in Han Han's drama film Duckweed, and patriotic war film The Founding of an Army as Deng Xiaoping. The same year, Dong was cast as one of the three protagonists in Namiya, the Chinese remake of Japanese novel Miracles of the Namiya General Store.

In 2018, Dong starred in the comedy film Dude's Manual.
The same year, Dong made his small-screen debut in the television series Like a Flowing River, based on the novel Da Jiang Dong Qu by Ah Nai and set in the period of Chinese economic reform. Forbes China listed Dong under their 30 Under 30 Asia 2017 list  which consisted of 30 influential people under 30 years old who have had a substantial effect in their fields.

Filmography

Film

Television series

Variety show

Discography

Awards and nominations

References

Chinese male television actors
Chinese male film actors
21st-century Chinese male actors
1993 births
Living people
Male actors from Beijing
Central Academy of Drama alumni